Scotts is an unincorporated community and census-designated place (CDP) in Kalamazoo County in the U.S. state of Michigan.  The community is located on the boundary between Climax Township and Pavilion Township.

Demographics

History 
Land at Scotts was first deeded to Dan Wheeler in 1835. Samuel Scott settled here in 1847 and the community became known as Scotts Crossing, later shortened to Scotts. A post office named Scotts opened on February 19, 1872, with Servetus Bathrick as its first postmaster. The community was platted by Bathrick in 1874.

Present
Scotts has a post office with ZIP code 49088, which serves large portions of Climax, Pavilion, and northwest Wakeshma Township, and westward to Indian Lake and Long Lake in the city of Portage.

The center of Scotts has several businesses, including a cafe, ice cream shop, general store, and salon, as well as a township fire station. The community was home to its own K-12 school district called Scotts School until 1946, when it consolidated with the nearby school district in Climax to form Climax-Scotts Community Schools. Facilities are split between the two communities. Climax-Scotts Elementary School (K-5) is located in Scotts on the former site of Scotts High School. Climax-Scotts Jr./Sr. High School (7-12), administrative offices, bussing, and athletic facilities are located 7 miles NE in Climax. In 2006, the original school bell for Scotts School was recovered and restored, and is now on display outside the Scotts Community Center.

On May 2, 2015, a 4.2 magnitude earthquake struck West Michigan, with the epicenter less than one mile NW of Scotts. The quake was felt from Wisconsin to southern Ontario, and revealed a previously unknown fault line stretching from Kalamazoo to Coldwater.

References

Census-designated places in Michigan
Census-designated places in Kalamazoo County, Michigan
Unincorporated communities in Kalamazoo County, Michigan
Populated places established in 1874
Unincorporated communities in Michigan
1874 establishments in Michigan